Bukhameh-ye Sofla (also known as Būkhāmeh, Būkhāmeh-ye Pā’īn, Dūbyān, Safhaw, Vakhāmeh, Valkhāmah-e Soflá, Valkhāmeh-ye Pā’īn, Vikhāma, and Volkhāmeh-ye Pā’īn) is a village in Abdoliyeh-ye Gharbi Rural District, in the Central District of Ramshir County, Khuzestan Province, Iran. At the 2006 census, its population was 492, in 74 families.

References 

Populated places in Ramshir County